Juraj Zemko is a Slovak professional ice hockey player who played with HC Slovan Bratislava in the Slovak Extraliga.

References

External links

Living people
HC Slovan Bratislava players
Year of birth missing (living people)
Slovak ice hockey defencemen
Slovak ice hockey forwards
Expatriate ice hockey players in Romania
Slovak expatriate ice hockey people
Slovak expatriate sportspeople in Romania